The Wings Over the World tour was a series of concerts in 1975 and 1976 by the British–American rock band Wings performed in Britain, Australia, Europe, the United States and Canada. The North American leg constituted band leader Paul McCartney's first live performances there since the Beatles' final tour, in 1966, and the only time Wings would perform live in the US and Canada. The world tour was well-attended and critically acclaimed, and resulted in a triple live album, Wings over America, which Capitol Records released in December 1976. In addition, the tour was documented in the television film Wings Over the World (1979) and a cinema release, Rockshow (1980).

The set list for much of the tour featured material from Wings' bestselling studios albums Band on the Run (1973), Venus and Mars (1975) and Wings at the Speed of Sound (1976), as well as some of McCartney's compositions from the Beatles era, including "Yesterday", "Lady Madonna" and "The Long and Winding Road". The inclusion of the latter songs proved especially popular and marked the first time that McCartney had performed material from the Beatles' catalogue in concert since their break-up, as he had previously vowed against playing any songs from that era. Aside from McCartney, the line-up of Wings included his wife Linda, Denny Laine, Jimmy McCulloch and Joe English, together with a brass section led by Howie Casey.

History
In contrast to Wings' low-profile 1972 tours and a 1973 tour of UK theatres, Wings Over the World was a highly publicised concert tour that took place mostly in arenas and stadiums, and in the American stages of this tour the band's entourage and equipment were transported to each successive venue in five 32-ton trucks. Around 1 million people attended the 66 shows, which were staged in six legs: Britain (September 1975); Australia (November 1975); Europe (March 1976); North America (May–June 1976); a return to Europe (September 1976); and three final concerts in London at Wembley's Empire Pool (October 1976). A tour of Japan was planned, but it was cancelled by that country's authorities due to McCartney's 1972 Swedish marijuana arrest.

The world tour followed the release of Wings' bestselling album Venus and Mars (1975), while the follow-up album, Wings at the Speed of Sound (1976), was completed after the band's Australian concerts. Both Venus and Mars and Band on the Run (1973) were well represented in the setlist for the two 1975 legs. Songs from Speed of Sound were then introduced into the set in March 1976, and McCartney is known to have remarked: "Everything I have done since The Beatles split has been leading up to this."

In order to demonstrate that Wings was not merely a McCartney showcase, Denny Laine sang lead vocals on several songs, including "Go Now", reprising his vocal from the Moody Blues' 1965 hit, and Simon & Garfunkel's song "Richard Cory". Jimmy McCulloch also sang lead, on his Venus and Mars composition "Medicine Jar". Of particular interest to fans and music critics, McCartney decided to perform five of his songs from the Beatles, thereby overcoming an earlier disinclination to do any at all. Performances of "Yesterday" and "The Long and Winding Road" used muted horn arrangements in place of their original strings. In the case of the latter song, the new arrangement emphasised McCartney's objections to the version released on Let It Be in 1970, where, according to McCartney, American producer Phil Spector had added orchestral and choral parts to the Beatles' 1969 recording without his approval.

Wings' line-up for this tour was Paul McCartney (vocals, bass, piano, acoustic guitar), Linda McCartney (keyboards, backing vocals), Denny Laine (vocals, electric and acoustic guitars, bass, keyboards, percussion), Jimmy McCulloch (electric and acoustic guitars, bass, vocals) and Joe English (drums, percussion, backing vocals). They were joined by brass and woodwind players Howie Casey, Steve Howard, Thaddeus Richard and Tony Dorsey. A documentary film of the tour, titled Wings Over the World, aired on US television in November 1979.

Wings over America
More than 600,000 people attended Wings' 31 shows in the United States and Canada, held between 3 May and 23 June 1976. In order to reduce the stress of moving their young family around the country during the course of the tour, the McCartneys rented houses in New York City, Dallas, Chicago and Los Angeles. Each night, they would fly in a specially chartered BAC One-Eleven to the closest of the four properties.

The beginning of the American leg of the tour was delayed for nearly a month because lead guitarist Jimmy McCulloch broke his finger after slipping when getting out of a bathtub in a Paris hotel. At one of the Los Angeles shows, McCartney's former Beatles bandmate Ringo Starr joined him on stage and handed him a bouquet of flowers.

Many of the concerts were professionally recorded. The best performances would later be compiled, after studio overdubs, for release as the triple album Wings over America in December 1976. In addition, a concert film combining footage from the Seattle, New York and Los Angeles shows was released in cinemas in 1980, as Rockshow, by Miramax Films.

Tour setlists

Tour dates

Box office score data

See also
 Rockshow

References

1975 concert tours
1976 concert tours
Wings (band) concert tours